Apostichopus is a genus of sea cucumbers in the family Stichopodidae.

Species
The following species are recognised in the genus Apostichopus:
 Apostichopus californicus (Stimpson, 1857)
 Apostichopus japonicus (Selenka, 1867)
 Apostichopus johnsoni (Théel, 1886)
 Apostichopus leukothele (Lambert, 1986)
 Apostichopus multidentis (Imaoka, 1991)
 Apostichopus nigripunctatus (Augustin, 1908)
 Apostichopus nipponensis (Imaoka, 1990)
 Apostichopus parvimensis (Clark, 1913)

References

 Taxonomy of Apostichopus in the World Register of Marine Species

Stichopodidae